The 2017 Aspria Tennis Cup was a professional tennis tournament played on clay courts. It was the twelfth edition of the tournament which was part of the 2017 ATP Challenger Tour. It took place in Milan, Italy between 26 June and 2 July 2017.

Singles main-draw entrants

Seeds

 1 Rankings are as of 19 June 2017.

Other entrants
The following players received wildcards into the singles main draw:
  Liam Caruana
  Gianluca Di Nicola
  Lorenzo Frigerio
  Gianluca Mager

The following players received entry into the singles main draw as special exempts:
  Alex Bolt
  Edan Leshem

The following player received entry into the singles main draw as an alternate:
  Andrea Collarini

The following players received entry from the qualifying draw:
  Juan Ignacio Londero
  Daniel Muñoz de la Nava
  Juan Pablo Paz
  João Pedro Sorgi

Champions

Singles

  Guido Pella def.  Federico Delbonis 6–2, 2–1 ret.

Doubles

  Tomasz Bednarek /  David Pel def.  Filippo Baldi /  Omar Giacalone 6–1, 6–1.

References

2017 ATP Challenger Tour
2017